Mark Yashaev (מארק ישייב) is an Israeli photographer.

Biography 

Mark Yashaev was born in Azerbaijan. At the age of nine years he immigrated to Israel with his family. Mark studied in photography department and received BEd from WIZO Haifa Academy of Design and Education. He received MFA in Bezalel Academy of Arts and Design in 2013.  Mark Yashaev started his photography work, documenting daily life of his immigrant family, producing a series of portraits, notable for intimacy. In his later work, Yashaev started to implement ideas of mounting photographs into an installation, including ready objects and exhibition space itself, creating a sculptural installations. Mark Yashaev works are in public and private collections around the world, including Tel Aviv Museum of Art permanent collection.

Exhibitions

Solo 
2016."Only from this suddenness and on". Curated by Raz Samira. Tel Aviv Museum of Art.
2015 "Even a black hole ends its life", WIZO Haifa Academy of Design and Education Gallery.
2012 "Memorandum of Understanding", Ramat Gan Museum of Israeli Art, Israel
2011 "Curriculum Vita", Curated by Sagit Zaloof Namir Jerusalem  Artists  House, Israel.

Group 
 2012  "Paris Square", Haifa Museum of Art, Israel
 2014 "Measure for Measure", Petah Tikva Museum of Art, Israel
 2015 "The  Potential of the unconscious", Mact/Cact, Bellinzona , Switzerland

Awards 
2015 The Lauren and Mitchell Presser Photography Award for a Young Israeli Artist.

References

External links 
Mark Yashaev

1981 births
Living people
Israeli photographers
Azerbaijani emigrants to Israel
Israeli people of Azerbaijani-Jewish descent
People from Baku
21st-century Israeli Jews